Blessed Sacrament Huguenot is the only private, co-ed, Early Learners through Grade 12 Catholic school in the Greater Richmond Region. Located on a  campus in Powhatan, Virginia, BSH is part of the Roman Catholic Diocese of Richmond. Students of any faith background are eligible for admission.

Background
Huguenot Academy was founded in Powhatan, Virginia, in 1959. It was originally housed in the basement of a local bank, but expanded when local business leaders donated land and resources.  By 1970, enrollment in grades kindergarten through twelve approached 500.  Huguenot Academy was known as a reputable academic institution well into the late 1980s, with enrollment approaching 750 at its peak.  But the 1990s brought difficulties for the school.  The Powhatan County public school system grew more healthy and Huguenot Academy found it difficult to retain students and teachers.

Blessed Sacrament High School purchased Huguenot Academy in 1998, blending the already-built facilities and infrastructure of  Huguenot Academy with the financial resources of the Catholic Diocese of Richmond.

References

External links
 bshknights.org School Website
 Knights Athletics School Athletic Website
 Video Tour of BSH 40-acre campus
 Video: BSH, Proud to Be a Knight
 Video: BSH High School Experience
 Video: BSH Middle School Experience
 Video: Parent Testimonials for Blessed Sacrament Huguenot
 Video: BSH Faith & Values Based Education, All faiths welcome
 Video: BSH Arts, Encouraging Exploration of Creativity, Risk-Taking, Collaboration, Diversity & Expression
 Video: BSH Playground Opening

Roman Catholic Diocese of Richmond
Private K-12 schools in Virginia
Catholic secondary schools in Virginia
Schools in Powhatan County, Virginia
Segregation academies in Virginia
Educational institutions established in 1959
1959 establishments in Virginia